Eucalyptus orthostemon, also known as diverse mallee, is a species of mallee that is endemic to the south-west of Western Australia. It has smooth coppery and greyish bark, linear adult leaves, oval to spindle-shaped buds in groups of seven, creamy white flowers and conical to cup-shaped fruit.

Description 
It has smooth coppery and greyish to silvery bark. Flowering occurs from January to February and the flowers are creamy white.

Taxonomy and naming
Eucalyptus orthostemon was first formally described in 2012 by Dean Nicolle and Ian Brooker from a specimen they collected between Yealering and Kulin in 2000. The specific epithet (orthostemon) is from ancient Greek, meaning "straight thread", referring to the stamens.

Distribution and habitat
This eucalypt grows in saline saltbush flats, mostly between Moora and Wongan Hills in the Avon Wheatbelt, Esperance Plains, Jarrah Forest and Mallee biogeographic regions.

Conservation
Eucalyptus orthostemon is classified as "not threatened" by the Western Australian Government Department of Parks and Wildlife.

See also
List of Eucalyptus species

References

orthostemon
Myrtales of Australia
Eucalypts of Western Australia
Plants described in 2012
Taxa named by Ian Brooker